Lost at Sea may refer to:

Castaway

Persons
 List of people who disappeared mysteriously at sea

Music
Lost @ Sea, an album by The Lads, 1998
Lost at Sea (Bounding Main album), 2005
Lost at Sea (Craig's Brother album), 2001
"Lost at Sea", a track on the album Standing Stone (1997) by Paul McCartney
"Lost at Sea", a track from the album Clarity (2013) by Zedd featuring Ryan Tedder

Print
Lost at Sea (comics), a 2003 graphic novel by Bryan Lee O'Malley
Lost at Sea: The Jon Ronson Mysteries, a 2012 novel by Jon Ronson
LAS Magazine, known as Lost At Sea or LostAtSea.net

Film
Lost at Sea (film), a lost 1926 silent film directed by Louis J. Gasnier

Television
"Lost at Sea" (NCIS), a 2012 episode of TV series NCIS
"Lost at Sea", an hour-long episode of the Disney Channel Original Series The Suite Life on Deck